Madonna and Child with Two Donors is an oil-on-canvas painting by the Italian Renaissance artist Lorenzo Lotto, created c. 1533–1535, now in the J. Paul Getty Museum in Los Angeles. It and other works by the artist originated in the Palazzo Pallavicini Rospigliosi collection in Rome before being sold to the Benson collection in London, then to the Hearst Corporation in New York and finally to its present owner.

References

1535 paintings
Two Donors
Paintings in the collection of the J. Paul Getty Museum